Severini is a surname. Notable people with the surname include:

 Aaron Severini, New York City Ballet dancer
 Carlo Severini (1872–1951), Italian mathematician
 Gino Severini (1883–1966), Italian painter

Italian-language surnames